Okno ( meaning window) is a Russian space surveillance station located in Nurak in Tajikistan. It is run by the Russian Space Forces and is part of the Centre for Outer Space Monitoring. Another facility, Okno-S, is in the Russian Far East.

The facility consists of a number of telescopes in domes and is similar to the US GEODSS system. It is designed for the detection and analysis of space objects such as satellites. The designers were awarded a Russian state prize for science and technology in 2004.

History
The Okno facility was started by the Soviet Union in 1979 using thousands of military unit No. 14464 "Construction Forces" draftees. All construction stopped in 1992 due to the civil war in Tajikistan and the centre started test operations in 1999 and combat duty in 2004. Ownership of the complex was transferred from Tajikistan to Russia in 2004 in return for the writing off of $242 million USD of Tajikistan's US$299 million debt to Russia.

A Russian-operated space surveillance system located in Tajikistan, Okno-M, has reached its full capacity, making it four times more powerful, the Russian Ministry of Defense reports in July 2015. The surveillance station successfully underwent state tests late in 2014.

When it was built it was believed by some in the west to be a military anti-satellite laser facility rather than one for optical tracking. In 1987 John E. Pike of the Federation of American Scientists was quoted as saying "Whether or not this facility will be capable of shooting down satellites or 'Star Wars,' it most certainly is developing the kind of technology that would eventually be able to do so."

A complex like Okno features in the Tom Clancy novel The Cardinal of the Kremlin, based on actual satellite photography of the site. The description of the installations in the book matches closely its actual configuration though not its real purpose, as the book is based on Okno being a laser antimissile system. The facility is also featured in the game Operation Flashpoint: Red River as an anti-aircraft base.

Function

Okno is a facility for tracking and monitoring man-made space objects. This is above low Earth orbit and includes satellites in medium Earth orbit, geostationary orbit and some in high Earth orbit. It only works at night and works passively by picking up reflected sunlight off objects. After 2014 modernization its range was increased to 50,000 km.

External links
Photos of the Nurek site [Russian]

The Okno site on Google Maps

References

Russian Space Forces
Military installations of Russia